Gyalo Thondup, born c.1927, is the second-eldest brother of the 14th Dalai Lama. He often acted as the Dalai Lama's unofficial envoy.

Early life
In late fall of 1927, Gyalo Thondup was born in the village of Taktser, Amdo (Ping'an District, Qinghai province). In 1939, he moved with his family to Lhasa.

In 1942, at the age of 14, Thondup went to Nanjing, the capital of Republican China, to study Standard Chinese and the history of China. He often visited Chiang Kai-shek at his home and ate dinner with him. "In fact, young Gyalo Thondup ate his meals at the Chiang family table, from April 1947 until the summer of 1949, and tutors selected by Chiang educated the boy." In 1948, he married Zhu Dan, the daughter of a Kuomintang general.

Political involvement
In 1949, before the Communist revolution of that year in China, Thondup left Nanjing for India via British Hong Kong. "Gyalo Thondup... was the first officially acknowledged Tibetan to visit Taiwan since 1949. Taipei Radio announced the meeting between President Chang Kai-shek on 21 May 1950." Fluent in Chinese, Tibetan and English, he "later facilitated semi-official contacts between the Tibetan-government-in-exile and the Republic of China (ROC) as well as with the People's Republic of China (PRC) government in 1979."

United States activities
In 1951, he traveled to America and became the main source of information on Tibet for the United States Department of State. America's Central Intelligence Agency promised to make Tibet independent from China in exchange for Thondup's support in organizing guerrilla units to fight against the People's Liberation Army, an offer which Thondup accepted. Thondup maintains that he did not inform the 14th Dalai Lama about the CIA's actions, and this support ended after the 1972 Nixon visit to China.

Later career
With the permission of the Dalai Lama, Thondup met Chinese leader Deng Xiaoping in 1979 for open political talks, which Thondup terminated in 1993, feeling them to be useless. In the 1990s, Thondup made several official visits to China, acting as the Dalai Lama's unofficial envoy. In recent years, Thondup has repeatedly stated that dialogue is the only way to achieve progress with China. In 1998, the Central Tibetan Administration in exile criticized Thondup for not letting the Dalai Lama know about the CIA's involvement in Tibet. Over a decade later, Thondup accused his sister-in-law's father of embezzling money from the Central Tibetan Administration.

See also 
 Thubten Norbu

Publications 
 (with Anne F. Thurston), The Noodle Maker of Kalimpong: The Untold Story of the Dalai Lama and the Secret Struggle for Tibet, PublicAffairs, 2015

References 

Tibetan politicians
Prime Ministers of Tibet
1920s births
Living people
People from Ping'an